Gymnopilus panurensis is a species of mushroom in the family Hymenogastraceae.

See also

List of Gymnopilus species

External links
Gymnopilus panurensis at Index Fungorum

panurensis
Fungi of North America